Elizabeth Crawford may refer to:

Elizabeth Crawford, American painter
Elizabeth Crawford (historian), suffrage researcher
Elizabeth Stewart, Countess of Crawford, 14th-century Scottish princess
Betty Crawford, character in the New Zealand soap opera Shortland Street